Taung, also known as Taung #56, is a constituency in Mohale's Hoek District in Lesotho. It begins at Ha-Mont'so where Mafeteng district ends.

Villages in Taung include Siloe, Ha-Mahlehle, Liphiring, Maralleng, Popolosi, Mohalinyane, Tsoloane and many others. 

Taung has a principal chief known as Moeketsi Monare. Deputy Minister of Foreign Affairs Phallang Monare represents this constituency in the Parliament of Lesotho.

Populated places in Mohale's Hoek District